The sacrament of holy orders in the Catholic Church includes three orders: bishops, priests, and deacons, in decreasing order of rank, collectively comprising the clergy. In the phrase "holy orders", the word "holy" means "set apart for a sacred purpose". The word "order" designates an established civil body or corporation with a hierarchy, and ordination means legal incorporation into an order. In context, therefore, a group with a hierarchical structure that is set apart for ministry in the Church.

Deacons, whether transitional or permanent, receive faculties to preach, to perform baptisms, and to witness marriages (either assisting the priest at the Mass, or officiating at a wedding not involving a Mass). They may assist at services where Holy Communion is given, such as the Mass, and they are considered the ordinary dispenser of the Precious Blood (the wine) when Communion is given in both types and a deacon is present, but they may not celebrate the Mass. They may officiate at a funeral service not involving a Mass, including a visitation (wake) or the graveside service at burial. Men in the last year of seminary training are typically ordained to the "transitional diaconate". This distinguishes men bound for priesthood from those who have entered the "permanent diaconate" and do not intend to seek ordination as a priest. After six months or more as a transitional deacon, a man will be ordained to the priesthood. Priests are able to preach, perform baptisms, witness marriages, hear confessions and give absolutions, anoint the sick, and celebrate the Eucharist or the Mass. Some priests are later chosen to be bishops who are the ordinary ministers of Confirmation and Holy Orders; bishops may ordain priests, deacons, and other bishops.

Bishops 

Bishops are chosen from among the priests in the Catholic Church. Among Eastern Catholic Churches, which permit married priests, bishops must be widowers or unmarried, or agree to abstain from sexual contact with their wives. Catholic bishops are often ordinaries (leaders) of territorial units called dioceses.

Normally, bishops administer the sacrament of holy orders. In Latin Church Catholic churches, only bishops (and priests with authorization by the local bishop) may licitly administer the sacrament of confirmation, but if an ordinary priest administers that sacrament illicitly, it is nonetheless considered valid, so that the person confirmed cannot be actually confirmed again, by a bishop or otherwise. Latin Church priests with special permission of the diocesan bishop or the Holy See can lawfully administer confirmation; every Catholic priest must administer confirmation, even without permission, to children in danger of death. In Eastern Catholic Churches, confirmation is done by parish priests via the rite of chrismation, and is usually administered to both babies and adults immediately after their baptism.

Priests 

The word either derives ultimately from the Greek πρεσβύτερος/presbuteros meaning "elder" or the Latin praepositus meaning "superintendent." The Catholic Church sees the Priesthood as both a reflection of the ancient Jewish priesthood in the Temple, and the work of Jesus as priest. The liturgy of ordination recalls the Old Testament priesthood and the priesthood of Christ. In the words of Thomas Aquinas, "Christ is the source of all priesthood: the priest of the old law was a prefiguration of Christ, and the priest of the new law acts in the person of Christ" Summa Theologiae III, 22, 4c.
Priests may celebrate Mass, hear confessions and give absolution, celebrate Baptism, serve as the Church's witness at the sacrament of Holy Matrimony, administer Anointing of the Sick, and administer Confirmation if authorized to do so by the bishop.
See  for the Second Vatican Council decree on the nature of the Catholic priesthood.

Rite
 
The Rite of Ordination occurs within the context of Holy Mass. After being called forward and presented to the assembly, the candidates are interrogated. Each promises to diligently perform the duties of the priesthood and to respect and obey his ordinary (bishop or religious superior). Then the candidates lie prostrate before the altar, while the assembled faithful kneel and pray for the help of all the saints in the singing of the Litany of the Saints.

The essential part of the rite is when the bishop silently lays his hands upon each candidate (followed by all priests present), before offering the consecratory prayer, addressed to God the Father, invoking the power of the Holy Spirit upon those being ordained.

After the consecratory prayer, the newly ordained is vested with the stole and chasuble of those belonging to the Ministerial Priesthood and then the bishop anoints his hands with chrism before presenting him with the chalice and paten which he will use when presiding at the Eucharist. Following this, the gifts of bread and wine are brought forward by the people and given to the new priest; then all the priests present, concelebrate the Eucharist with the newly ordained taking the place of honour at the right of the bishop. If there are several newly ordained, it is they who gather closest to the bishop during the Eucharistic Prayer.

The laying of hands of the priesthood is found in 1 Timothy 4:14:
Do not neglect the gift you have, which was conferred on you through the prophetic word with the imposition of hands of the presbyterate.

The following is the full text of the Rite during the Mass (after the Gospel), taken from a program for an ordination of priests for the Diocese of Peoria in 2015:
The Calling of the Candidates: Those to be ordained are called by name, they stand in their place and answer: "Present".
The Presentation of the Priest Candidates:
Vocation Director: Most Reverend Father, Holy Mother Church asks you to ordain these, our brothers, to the responsibility of the Priesthood.
Bishop: Do you know them to be worthy?
Vocation Director: After inquiry among the Christian people and upon the recommendation of those responsible, I testify that they have been found worthy.
Bishop: Relying on the help of the Lord God and our Savior Jesus Christ, we choose these men, our brothers, for the Order of the Priesthood.
All: Thanks be to God.
Homily of the Bishop
Promise of the Elect:
Bishop: My dear sons, before you enter the Order of the Priesthood, you must declare before the people of God your intention to undertake this office. Do you resolve, with the help of the Holy Spirit, to discharge without fail the office of Priesthood in the presbyteral rank, as worthy fellow workers with the Order of Bishops in caring for the Lord's flock?
Elect: I do.
Bishop: Do you resolve to exercise the ministry of the word worthily and wisely, preaching the Gospel and teaching the Catholic faith?
Elect: I do.
Bishop: Do you resolve to celebrate faithfully and reverently, in accord with the Church's tradition, the mysteries of Christ, especially the Sacrifice of the Eucharist and the Sacrament of Reconciliation, for the glory of God and the sanctification of the Christian people?
Elect: I do.
Bishop: Do you resolve to implore with us God's mercy upon the people entrusted to your care by observing the command to pray without ceasing?
Elect: I do.
Bishop: Do you resolve to be united more closely every day to Christ the High Priest, who offered himself for us to the Father as a pure Sacrifice, and with him to consecrate yourselves to God for the salvation of all?
Elect: I do, with the help of God.
Promise of Obedience of the Priest Candidates:
Each of the candidates goes to the Bishop and, kneeling before him, places his joined hands between those of the Bishop.
Bishop: Do you promise respect and obedience to me and my successors?
Elect: I do.
Bishop: May God, who has begun this good work in you bring it to fulfillment.
Invitation to Prayer
Litany of the Saints
Laying on of Hands: The Bishop first lays hands on the head of each candidate, followed by the concelebrating priests and all the priests present.
Prayer of Consecration
Investiture with the Stole and Chasuble
Anointing of Hands: The Bishop receives the linen gremial and anoints with Sacred Chrism the palms of each new priest as he kneels before him.
Procession of the Gifts of Bread and Wine by the relatives of the ordained and Offertory Hymn
Presentation of the Gifts
The Bishop stands and gives the kiss of peace to the new priests, followed by the concelebrants and all the priests present.
The mass then proceeds as normal with the Liturgy of the Eucharist, with the newly ordained priests to the immediate right of the bishop and the other celebrants.

Deacons 

The Diaconate is one of the three Major Orders in the Catholic Church.
The first deacons were ordained by the Apostles in Acts of the Apostles chapter 6.
The ministry of the deacon in the Roman Catholic Church is described as one of service in three areas: the Word, the Liturgy and Charity. The deacon's ministry of the Word includes proclaiming the Gospel during the Mass, preaching and teaching. The deacon's liturgical ministry includes various parts of the Mass proper to the deacon, including being an ordinary minister of Holy Communion and the proper minister of the chalice when Holy Communion is administered under both kinds. The ministry of charity involves service to the poor and marginalized and working with parishioners to help them become more involved in such ministry.
As clerics, deacons are required to say the Liturgy of the Hours daily; Deacons, like bishops and priests, are ordinary ministers of the Sacrament of Baptism and can serve as the church's witness at the sacrament of Holy Matrimony, which the bride and groom administer to each other.
Deacons may also preside over funeral rites outside of Mass, They can preside over various services such as Benediction of the Blessed Sacrament, and they may give certain blessings.

Minor orders 

From the 3rd century AD up until seven years after the Second Vatican Council (1962–1965), the Catholic Church had four minor orders (porter, lector, exorcist,  and acolyte) up to the order of subdeacon, which were conferred on seminarians pro forma before they became deacons. The minor orders and the subdiaconate were not considered sacraments, and for simplicity were suppressed under Pope Paul VI in 1972. Only those orders (deacon, priest, bishop) previously considered major orders of divine institution were retained in most of the Latin Church.

Holy orders 
Holy orders is one of three Catholic sacraments that Catholics believe to make an indelible mark called a sacramental character on the recipient's soul (the other two are baptism and confirmation). This sacrament can only be conferred on baptized men. If a woman attempts to receive the sacrament of Holy Orders, both she and any persons who attempt to ordain her are excommunicated latae sententiae.

Such titles as cardinal, monsignor, archbishop, etc., are not sacramental orders. These are simply offices; to receive one of those titles is not an instance of the sacrament of holy orders.

Norms 
The Catholic Church recognizes the validity of holy orders administered by the Eastern Orthodox, Polish National, Oriental Orthodox, and the Assyrian Church of the East because those churches have maintained the apostolic succession of bishops, i.e., their bishops claim to be in a line of succession dating back to the Apostles, just as Catholic bishops do. Consequently, if a priest of one of those eastern churches converts to Catholicism, his ordination is already valid; however, to exercise the order received, he would need to be incardinated either into a religious ordained in the Catholic Church (though there is much debate in the Orthodox Church about this); that is part of the policy called church economy.

A controversy in the Catholic Church over the question of whether Anglican holy orders are valid was settled by Pope Leo XIII in 1896, who wrote in  that Anglican orders lack validity because the rite by which priests were ordained was not correctly performed from 1547 to 1553 and from 1558 to the 19th century, thus causing a break of continuity in apostolic succession and a break with the sacramental intention of the Church. Leo XIII condemned the Anglican ordinals and deemed the Anglican orders "absolutely null and utterly void". Some Changes in the Anglican Ordinal since King Edward VI, and a fuller appreciation of the pre-Reformation ordinals suggest, according to some private theologians, that the correctness of the dismissal of Anglican orders may be questioned; however  remains the definitive teaching of the Catholic Church and was reinforced by then-Cardinal Joseph Ratzinger, who later became Pope Benedict XVI.

Since 1896 many Anglican bishops have been consecrated by bishops of the Old Catholic Church. Nevertheless, all Anglican clergymen who desire to enter the Catholic Church do so as laymen and must be ordained in the Catholic Church in order to serve as priests.

Catholics do not recognize the ordination of ministers in other, Protestant, churches that do not maintain the apostolic succession. The Lutheran Churches of Sweden and Finland from some point of view possibly possess valid apostolic succession. This is not the case for the Lutheran Churches of Norway, Denmark, and Iceland where there occurred breaks in succession.

Anglicans accept the ordination of most mainline denominations; however, only those denominations in full communion with the Anglican Communion, such as some Lutheran denominations, may preside at services requiring a priest.

Marriage and holy orders 

Married men may be ordained to the diaconate as permanent deacons, but in the Latin Church may not be ordained to the priesthood. (Married non-Catholic clergy who convert to Roman Catholicism may, in some cases, be ordained priests.) In the Eastern Catholic Churches and in the Eastern Orthodox Church married deacons may be ordained priests, but may not become bishops. Bishops in the Eastern Catholic and the Eastern Orthodox churches are almost always drawn from among monks, who have taken a vow of celibacy. They may be widowers, though; it is not required of them never to have been married.

Clerical celibacy 

There is a distinction drawn between chastity and celibacy. Celibacy is the state of not being married, so a promise of celibacy is a promise not to enter into marriage but instead to consecrate one's life to service (in other words, "married to God"). Chastity, a virtue expected of all Christians, is the state of sexual purity; for a vowed celibate, or for the single person, chastity means the abstinence from sexual activity. For the married person, chastity means the practice of sex only within marriage.

See also 

 Ordination of women and the Catholic Church

Notes

Bibliography